Gymnobela dautzenbergi is a species of sea snail, a marine gastropod mollusk in the family Raphitomidae.

Description
The length of the shell attains 10 mm.

Distribution
This marine species occurs off Mauretania.

References

External links
 
 Rolán E., Otero-Schmitt J. & Fernandes F. (1998) The family Turridae s. l. (Mollusca, Neogastropoda) in Angola (West Africa). 1. Subfamily Daphnellinae. Iberus, 16: 95–118
 Gastropods.com: Gymnobela dautzenbergi

dautzenbergi
Gastropods described in 1952